Amanda Jayne Broderick (born 1971) is a British marketer, academic and academic administrator who has been the vice-chancellor and president of the University of East London since September 2018. She is also professor of international business.

Biography 
With family origins in Afghanistan, Belgium, Ireland and Hull, Broderick was born in 1971 and brought up in Staffordshire, England. She graduated from De Montfort University in Leicester, UK with a 1st Class Bachelor of Arts (BA) degree in marketing and psychology and a Doctor of Philosophy (PhD) degree in international business.

Career 
She previously lectured at the University of Newcastle, the University of Salford, Durham University, Coventry University, Aston University and De Montfort University. Before moving to Newcastle University, she was pro-vice chancellor (International Priorities) and founding executive dean of the College of Business & Law, University of Salford; principal of St. Cuthbert's Society (a Durham University College)  and deputy dean of Durham Business School. She also led the development of the University Academy 92, founded by the Class of ’92 and Lancaster University and launched in September 2017. In 2019, she was elected as UK representative on the Association of Commonwealth Universities Council.

Research 
Broderick's expertise lies in the fields of international business, marketing psychology and strategic communications. She has authored two seminal texts in her field  and has a track record in research and enterprise funding.

Professional service 
During her tenure as dean at Salford, it was  the 2014 Times Higher Education Business School of the Year.

In 2019, she was elected as UK representative on the Association of Commonwealth Universities (ACU) Council.

References 

1971 births
Living people
Alumni of De Montfort University
Academics of Newcastle University
Academics of the University of Salford
Academics of Durham University
Academics of De Montfort University
Academics of Aston University
Academics of Coventry University
Women deans (academic)
British university and college faculty deans
Academics of the University of East London
British business theorists
People from Staffordshire
British textbook writers
21st-century British women writers
20th-century British women writers